Chignik Fisheries Airport  was a public-use airport located  northwest of Chignik, a city in the Lake and Peninsula Borough of the U.S. state of Alaska.

Facilities and aircraft 
Chignik Fisheries Airport had one runway designated 4/22 with a gravel surface measuring 1,630 by 30 feet (497 x 9 m). The airport had an average of 33 aircraft operations per month: 62% air taxi and 37% general aviation.

See also 
 Chignik Airport 
 Chignik Bay Seaplane Base 
 Chignik Lagoon Airport 
 Chignik Lake Airport

References

External links 
 Airport diagram for Chignik Fisheries (KCG), Chignik, Alaska (GIF). FAA, Alaska Region. 25 Dec 2003.
 Aeronautical chart showing former location of airport. SkyVector. Retrieved 7 Sep 2009.

Defunct airports in Alaska
Airports in Lake and Peninsula Borough, Alaska